Club Libby Lu was an experiential/experience-based retailer for young girls ages 4 to 12. Founded by Mary Drolet, a former executive at Claire's and Montgomery Ward, in August 2000, the store chain employed 98 stores in 28 states in the United States before closing in 2009. The stores were named after founder Mary Drolet's childhood imaginary friend.

A makeover cost between $25–$60, depending on the package of choice, and included a full hair updo, nail polish, and makeup. In addition to playing dress-up for the day, Club Libby Lu VIPs (Very Important Princesses) were guided by their Club Counselors over to various sites including a "potion bar" where a VIP could make their own lotion, perfume, fairy dust, or lip gloss, and a Pooch Parlor, where the guests could own stuffed animals of their choice. At the end of every experience, each VIP was encouraged to join the free club, and was given a friendship bracelet.

History
Club Libby Lu was opened in 2000 by Mary Drolet and her two partners in a suburban Chicago mall based on the three partners' concepts. In 2003, Saks, Inc. purchased Club Libby Lu when it had 11 stores. 50 locations were opened in 2004. With a bit of advertising by 2005, revenues were about $46 million, a 53% increase over 2004. In 2006, the chain had 87 locations. 

In early November 2008, parent company Saks Incorporated announced that due to the dismal state of the economy they would be closing all 98 locations.

References

Children's clothing retailers
Clothing retailers of the United States
Retail companies established in 2000
Retail companies disestablished in 2009
Defunct retail companies of the United States